The 1903 Iowa Hawkeyes football team represented the University of Iowa in the 1903 college football season. This season was John Chalmers' first as head coach of the Hawkeyes.

Schedule

References

Iowa
Iowa Hawkeyes football seasons
Iowa Hawkeyes football